Rabivere is a village in Kohila Parish, Rapla County in northwestern Estonia.

Rabivere manor

Rabivere estate is mentioned for the first time in written sources in 1417. The present manor house is a relatively small, one-storey building of an unusual, local simple baroque design and built of wood.

References

Villages in Rapla County
Kreis Harrien